Maspero (  ) is the name of the huge building on the bank of the Nile river in Cairo, Egypt. It is the headquarters of the Egyptian Radio and Television Union (formerly the Arab Radio and Television Union, the oldest state-run broadcasting organisation in the Arab World and Africa. Maspero is also the name of the street, which this building overlooks.

History 
Gamal Abdel Nasser, the President of the United Arab Republic (of which Egypt was then a part) ordered the construction of the building in August 1959. The first broadcast from Maspero commenced on 21 July 1960 with the country's introduction of television on the eighth anniversary of the Egyptian Revolution of 1952. The building was named after the French archaeologist Gaston Maspero, who was the chairman of the Egyptian Antiquities Authority.

As a key institution of the state, it was one of the first state buildings to be protected by the Egyptian Army during the outbreak of the Egyptian Revolution of 2011.

See also 
 Maspero demonstrations
 Maspero massacre

References 

Office buildings completed in 1960
Towers completed in 1960
20th century in Egypt
Buildings and structures in Cairo
Mass media company headquarters
20th-century architecture in Egypt